Simon Koshland (1825–1896) was a Kingdom of Bavaria-born American businessman, and wool merchant. He is the patriarch of the Koshland family of San Francisco.

Biography
Simon Koshland was born in Ichenhausen, Kingdom of Bavaria in 1825. In 1850, he immigrated to Sacramento via Panama with his older brother where they opened a general merchandise store. In 1862, he moved to San Francisco after his store was burned down in a flood where he and his brother opened a wool house named Koshland Brothers. The company eventually morphed into Koshland & Sons and became the leading wool house in America.

Koshland retired in the 1890s; his sons and sons-in-law continued the family business.

Personal life
Koshland was married Rosina Franenthal of Philadelphia; they had 8 children: Isidore Koshland; Joseph Koshland (1854–1940); Marcus Simon Koshland (1858–1930); Henrietta Koshland Sinsheimer (born 1860); Caroline Koshland Greenebaum (1863–1946); Frances Koshland Haas (1865–1949); Montefiore T. Koshland (born 1868); Abraham Koshland (1869–1944); and Jesse Koshland (1871–1966).

He was a member of Ohabai Shalome Congregation; and later Temple Emanu-El. He died in 1896, and is buried at Home of Peace Cemetery in Colma, California. His daughter Frances married Abraham Haas. His son Marcus had a son, Daniel E. Koshland Sr., who married Eleanor Haas, the daughter of Abraham Haas.

References

1825 births
American company founders
People from Günzburg (district)
1896 deaths
Bavarian emigrants to the United States
Businesspeople from California
Koshland family
19th-century American businesspeople
Burials at Home of Peace Cemetery (Colma, California)